Singold is a river of Bavaria, Germany. It flows into the Fabrikkanal, an artificial branch of the Wertach, near Augsburg.

See also
List of rivers of Bavaria

References

Rivers of Bavaria
Ostallgäu
Augsburg (district)
Landsberg (district)
Rivers of Germany